Arabis kennedyae, the Troodos rockcress, is a species of flowering plant in the family Brassicaceae.
It is endemic to Cyprus. Its natural habitat is Mediterranean-type shrubby vegetation. It is threatened by habitat loss.

See also 

 List of Arabis species

References

kennedyae
Endemic flora of Cyprus
Critically endangered plants
Critically endangered flora of Asia
Critically endangered biota of Europe
Taxonomy articles created by Polbot